TNN may refer to:

 The National Network, a former name of the U.S. TV channel Paramount Network
 The Nashville Network, an American country music-oriented cable television network
 Tainan Airport (airport code TNN)
 Times News Network, a news agency started by The Times of India
 TNN Bass Tournament of Champions, fishing video game
 TNN Motorsports Hardcore Heat, racing video game
 TNN Radio, an American radio station in Anaheim, California
 TNN24, a Thai news channel
 Tribal News Network, a Pakistani news network